Walnut Ridge is a city in Lawrence County, Arkansas, United States. The population was 5098 at the United States Census's 2019 estimate. The city is the county seat of Lawrence County. Walnut Ridge lies immediately north of Hoxie. The two towns form a contiguous urban area with approximately 8,000 residents. Williams Baptist University is in College City, a formerly separate community that merged into Walnut Ridge in 2017.

History
Walnut Ridge was formally established in 1875 as a result of the railroad coming through the area. There was settlement in the area known as Old Walnut Ridge not far from the current city since about 1860.

In 1964, the Beatles briefly stopped at Walnut Ridge Regional Airport on the way to and from a retreat in Missouri. This visit inspired a monument, a plaza, and a music festival in Walnut Ridge.

Geography
Walnut Ridge is in northeastern Lawrence County in the Upper Delta region of northeastern Arkansas. It is bordered to the south by the city of Hoxie. U.S. Route 412 passes through the center of Walnut Ridge on Main Street, leading east  to Paragould and northwest  to Hardy. U.S. Route 67 passes through the east side of Walnut Ridge on a four-lane bypass; the highway leads north  to Pocahontas and southwest  to Newport. Arkansas Highway 34 runs northeast out of the center of Walnut Ridge on Front Street, leading  to Delaplaine.

Village Creek flows through the western side of the city, leading southwest to the White River near Newport.

Climate
Climate is characterized by relatively high temperatures and evenly distributed precipitation throughout the year.  The Köppen Climate Classification subtype for this climate is "Cfa"  (Humid Subtropical Climate).
<div style="width:75%">

</div style>

Demographics

2020 census

As of the 2020 United States census, there were 5,384 people, 1,754 households, and 1,230 families residing in the city.

2000 census
As of the census of 2000, there were 4,925 permanent residents, 2,065 homeholds, and 1,305 families living in the town. The racial makeup of the city was 97.04% White, 0.59% Black or African American, 0.51% Native American, 0.12% Asian, and 1.75% from two or more races.  0.43% of the population were Hispanic or Latino of any race.

There were 2,065 households, out of which 27.9% had children under the age of 18 living with them, 50.0% were married couples living together, 10.4% had a female householder with no husband present, and 36.8% were non-families. 33.5% of all households were made up of individuals, and 19.0% had someone living alone who was 65 years of age or older.  The average household size was 2.24 and the average family size was 2.85.

In the city, the population was spread out, with 21.4% under the age of 18, 8.7% from 18 to 24, 24.7% from 25 to 44, 22.3% from 45 to 64, and 22.9% who were 65 years of age or older.  The median age was 41 years. For every 100 females, there were 83.6 males.  For every 100 females age >18, there were 77.6 males.

The median income for a household in the city was $28,953, and the median income for a family was $36,735. Males had a median income of $27,458 versus $20,169 for females. The per capita income for the city was $14,974.  About 10.0% of families and 13.6% of the population were below the international poverty limit, including 15.9% of those under 18 and 18.6% of those 65 or older.

Education 
Public education for elementary and secondary school students in most of the city is provided from the Lawrence County School District, which includes Walnut Ridge Elementary School and Walnut Ridge High School. Some portions are within the Hoxie School District, which operates Hoxie High School. The Walnut Ridge School District was in operation until July 1, 2006, when it merged with the Black Rock School District to form the Lawrence County district.

Infrastructure

Transportation 
Walnut Ridge (Amtrak station)

List of highways

 U.S. 67 Business
 U.S. 412
 Highway 34
 Highway 91

Airport 
 Walnut Ridge Regional Airport (KARG)

Notable people 
 James T. Conway, 34th Commandant of the Marine Corps
 Michelle Gray, Republican member of the Arkansas House of Representatives from Izard County, former Walnut Ridge resident
 David J. Sanders, member of the Arkansas State Senate from District 15, including part of Little Rock
 Ehron VonAllen, Electronic musician, singer (birth name: Aaron Allen)
 Washboard Sam, blues musician
 Milt Yarberry, gunfighter, first town marshal of Albuquerque, New Mexico
 Glenn Yates Jr., architect and Virginia state legislator

See also

 List of cities and towns in Arkansas

References

External links

 Official website

Cities in Lawrence County, Arkansas
Cities in Arkansas
County seats in Arkansas
Populated places established in 1875
1875 establishments in Arkansas